Java Application Descriptor (JAD) files describe the MIDlets (Java ME applications) that are distributed as JAR files. JAD files are commonly used to package Java applications or games that can be downloaded to mobile phones. Java applications enable mobile phones to interact functionally with online web services, such as the ability to send SMS messages via GSM mobile Internet or interact in multiplayer games. Some BlackBerry devices use JAD files for themes, while on some mobile phones without memory cards it is not possible to download any apps.

Recent midlets contain a manifest file in the JAR archive. This file contains much of the information stored in the JAD file, rendering it unnecessary in most cases.

JAD mime type
The MIDP2 specification instructs that web servers should serve JAD files with a MIME type of "". If this MIME type is not correctly configured, many phones will fail to install the MIDlet.

Example

See also
.sis
Midp2

References

External links
JADs and JARs
Retrieving MIDlet Attributes

Java (programming language)